The 1965 Leyton by-election was a parliamentary by-election held on 21 January 1965 for the British House of Commons constituency of Leyton in east London.

The seat had become vacant when the constituency's long-serving Labour Member of Parliament (MP), Reginald Sorensen, was made a life peer on 15 December 1964.  An MP for over thirty years, his elevation to the peerage was intended to create a vacancy in a safe seat for the Foreign Secretary, Patrick Gordon Walker, who had been defeated in a shock result in the 1964 general election in his Smethwick constituency.

The result of the contest was not as planned: the Conservative Party candidate, Ronald Buxton, won with a majority of 205 votes, a swing from Labour of 8.7%. Gordon-Walker resigned as Foreign Secretary but regained the seat for Labour at the 1966 general election.

Votes

See also 
Leyton (UK Parliament constituency)
Leyton
List of United Kingdom by-elections

References 
British Parliamentary by-elections: Leyton
UK General Elections since 1832 

Leyton,1965
Leyton by-election
Leyton,1965
Leyton by-election
Leyton by-election
Leyton